John Kruth is a singer/songwriter/multi-instrumentalist best known for his highly energetic “Banshee Mandolin” style of playing. He has also worked as a music journalist and has authored several book about popular music.

Biography
He is also proficient on guitar, banjo, harmonica and various flutes. Kruth is co-founder and the main songwriter of New York-based world music ensemble TriBeCaStan, and also a music journalist and author.

Kruth’s first biography, Bright Moments – The Life and Legacy of Rahsaan Roland Kirk was first published in the U.S. and England in 2000 by Welcome Rain Books. Bright Moments was translated into Japanese and published by Kawade Shobō Shinsha in 2005. His most recent biography is Rhapsody In Black - The Life and Music of Roy Orbison from Hal Leonard Books, NYC. He is also the author of To Live’s To Fly - the Ballad of Townes Van Zandt, was published by Da Capo Books in March 2007, winner of 2008 Deems Taylor ASCAP Award for Best Musical Biography.

Kruth has twelve solo albums to his credit. His CD Splitsville was released in the fall of 2008 by Smiling Fez Records. In November 1997 Kruth performed at Carnegie Hall as a soloist for composer John Corigliano on the Moroccan folk oboe called the ghaita, commonly played by the Master Musicians of Jajouka. Besides leading the New York-based world music ensemble TriBeCaStan, Kruth has also performed with playwright Sam Shepard, poet Allen Ginsberg, Patti Smith, performance artist Laurie Anderson, producer Hal Willner, folksinger John Prine, as well as Violent Femmes, the Meat Puppets, King Missile, Peter Stampfel, Rick Danko, Garth Hudson, James Belushi, Steve Buscemi, Eric von Schmidt, Stan Ridgeway, Bob Neuwirth, Die Kreuzen, Cyberchump and members of Camper Van Beethoven.

In 2006, he traveled to India where he studied mandolin and performed with Carnatic mandolin virtuoso U. Rajesh.

Kruth is currently a Professor of Music at the College of Mount St. Vincent. In the past, his writing has appeared in the New York Times, Rolling Stone, The Progressive, Frets, and Signal to Noise. He is currently a regular contributor to Rave (India), Sing Out!, Wax Poetics and Fretboard Journal. He spent much of his early career in Milwaukee, but now lives in New York City.

Discography
 1987: Midnight Snack, Hopewell Records (with Violent Femmes)
 1989: Greasy Kid Stuff, Chameleon Records (with Brian Ritchie)
 1989: Final Vinyl, Chameleon Records (song Boomerang appeared on picture disc with John Lee Hooker, L7 and Bill Ward)
 1992: Banshee Mandolin, Flying Fish Records
 1994: Blind Bear, Dupah Disc (song on children’s compilation Shrimp Whistles)
 1995: Midnight Snack, Spit Records (re-issue of 1987 release)
 1995: The Cherry Electric, Weasel Disc
 1996: Toast, Weasel Disc (with Jonathan Segel and Victor Krummenacher)
 1998: Last Year Was A Great Day, Gadfly Records (with Gordon Gano)
 1999: Moon Dog Girl, Sparkling Beatnik Records (with Elliott Sharp and Jonathan Segel)
 2000: Everywhere You’ve Never Been, Label M/Smiling Fez Records (with Frank London)
 2001: Harry and Albert, Electronic Music Foundation (song on State of the Union compilation produced by Elliott Sharp)
 2002: Share The Failure, Smithsonian Folkways Records (song on Fast Folk compilation)
 2004: Songs from the Windy Attic, Smiling Fez Records
 2007: Eva Destruction, Crustacean Records (with members of Violent Femmes, Plasticland and Die Kreuzen)
 2008: Splitsville - Sonic Impressions of Croatia (with Matt Darriau, Jonathan Segel and Victor Krummenacher), Smiling Fez Records
 2015: The Drunken Wind of Life - The Song/Poems of Tin Ujevic (with Miroslav and Gordana Evacic and Jonathan Segel and Victor Krummenacher), Smiling Fez Records
 2018: Forever Ago, Ars Spoletium Publishing (Italy)
 2021: Love Letters from The Lazaretto

John Kruth has appeared on recordings by James Blood Ulmer, Sex Mob, Reptile Palace Orchestra, Lambchop, Die Kreuzen, Tiny Lights, Brian Ritchie, Gideon Freudmann, Christine Lavin, Lillie Palmer, Rod MacDonald and The Mercy Seat.

Publications

Books
 2017 - A Friend of the Devil - The Glorification of the Outlaw in Song - From Robin Hood to Rap - Hal Leonard Books, NYC -  288 pages
 2015 - This Bird Has Flown - The Enduring Beauty of Rubber Soul - 50 Years On- Hal Leonard Books, NYC
 2013 - Rhapsody In Black - The Life and Music of Roy Orbison - Hal Leonard Books, NYC 
 2008 -  Rahsaan Roland Kirk - Des Moments Lumineux French edition published by INFOLIO Musique Edition 
 2007 - To Live's To Fly -The Ballad of the Late, Great Townes Van Zandt - Da Capo Books, NYC. 236 pages. Winner of 2008 Deems Taylor ASCAP Award for Best Musical Biography
 2005 - Bright Moments – The Life and Legacy of Rahsaan Roland Kirk – Japanese edition published by Kawade Shobō Shinsha, Tokyo, Japan. 400 pages.
 2000 – Bright Moments – The Life and Legacy of Rahsaan Roland Kirk - Welcome Rain Books, NYC. 400 pages.

Poetry and Short Prose
 1992 – "Like Jazz" – Spanfeller Press (illustrated by Joe Ciardiello)
 1992 – "Little Bullets" – Barefoot Press (illustrated by Marvin Hill  http://www.marvinhill.com))
 1989 – "The Bayou Stomp" – Jackalope Press (illustrated by Marvin Hill  http://www.marvinhill.com)
 1989 – "The Horrorscope" – Jackalope Press (with collages by the author)
 1988 – "The Perfumed Firecracker" – Jackalope Press (illustrated by Lane Smith)
 1986 – "Bed Crumbs" – Jackalope Press (illustrated by Gary Panter)
 1984 – "Exorcises" – Jackalope Press (illustrated by Henrik Drescher)
 1983 – "Modern Heaven" – Jackalope Press (illustrated by Randall Enos)

Notes

External links
 Evergreen Music, bio of John Kruth

References
 http://www.jerryjazzmusician.com,
 http://www.crustaceanrecords.com,
 http://www.allmusic.com,
 http://www.puremusic.com,
 http://www.sharkforum.org,
 http://www.emando.com,
 https://web.archive.org/web/20110924190827/http://www.shilv.org/

Living people
American folk singers
American music journalists
American singer-songwriters
American male singer-songwriters
Fast Folk artists
American mandolinists
American jazz mandolinists
Jazz mandolinists
Year of birth missing (living people)